Med solen i ögonen is the third studio album by Swedish singer-songwriter Lars Winnerbäck, released in 1998. The  album was produced by Johan Johansson and released by Universal Music. The title track of the album was released as a single in February 1999. The album has been certified platinum in Sweden and peaked at number 13 on the Swedish Album Chart, which it did in 2011.

Track listing 
Adapted from Apple Music.

 Gråa dagar (4:52), Grey Days
 Tvivel (5:26), Doubt
 Mamma är säkert nöjd (3:57), Mom is Probably Pleased
 Idiot (2:56)
 Pacemaker (5:57)
 Pollenchock & stjärnfall (4:58), Pollen Shock and Shooting Stars
 Att fånga en fjäril (4:16), To Catch a Butterfly
 Vinter över ån (4:11), Winter on the Stream
 Solen i ögonen (3:31), The Sun in Your Eyes
 Med bussen från stan (4:30), With the Bus from the City
 Varning för ras (4:58), Beware of Avalanches

Charts

References 

1998 albums
Lars Winnerbäck albums